The governor of Georgia is the head of government of Georgia and the commander-in-chief of the state's military forces. The governor also has a duty to enforce state laws, the power to either veto or approve bills passed by the Georgia Legislature, and the power to convene the legislature. The current governor is Republican Brian Kemp, who assumed office on January 14, 2019.

There have officially been 77 governors of the state of Georgia, including 11 who served more than one distinct term (John Houstoun, George Walton, Edward Telfair, George Mathews, Jared Irwin, David Brydie Mitchell, George Rockingham Gilmer, M. Hoke Smith, Joseph Mackey Brown, John M. Slaton, and Eugene Talmadge, with Herman Talmadge serving two de facto distinct terms). The early days were chaotic, with several gaps and schisms in the state's power structure, as the state capital of Savannah was captured during the American Revolutionary War. After independence was achieved, the office was solidly Democratic-Republican until the 1830s, when the office began to be contested by Democrats and Whigs for a few decades. The state seceded and was part of the Confederate States of America during the American Civil War, after which it had several governors appointed by the President of the United States and the military occupation. During Reconstruction, it had two Republican governors, but after local rule was re-established, Democrats would be the only party elected for the next 131 years.

The longest-serving governors are George Busbee, Joe Frank Harris, Zell Miller, Sonny Perdue, and Nathan Deal, each of whom served two full four-year terms; Joseph E. Brown, governor during the Civil War, was elected four times, serving seven and a half years. The shortest term of the post-revolutionary period is that of Matthew Talbot, who served 13 days after succeeding his predecessor who died in office. One man, Eugene Talmadge, died before taking office in his third distinct term, leading to a dispute in which three people claimed the office.

Governors 

Georgia was one of the original Thirteen Colonies and ratified the Constitution of the United States on January 2, 1788. It seceded from the Union on January 19, 1861, and was a founding member of the Confederate States of America on February 4, 1861. Following the end of the American Civil War, Georgia during Reconstruction was part of the Third Military District, which exerted control over governor appointments and elections. Georgia was readmitted to the Union on July 25, 1868, expelled from Congress for failures in Reconstruction on March 3, 1869, and again readmitted on July 15, 1870.

Selection and length of term
In Georgia's Rules and Regulations of 1776, considered by some to be the first constitution, the chief executive was a president chosen by the legislature every six months. This was quickly superseded by the 1777 constitution, which called for a governor to be chosen by the legislature each year, with a term limited to one year out of every three. The governor's term was lengthened to two years in the 1789 constitution, and an 1824 amendment provided for popular election of the governor. While the 1861 secessionist constitution kept the office the same, the 1865 constitution, following Georgia's surrender, limited governors to two consecutive terms of two years each, allowing them to serve again after a gap of four years. The Reconstruction constitution of 1868 increased the governor's term to four years. The 1877 constitution, after the end of Reconstruction, returned the office to the provisions of the 1865 constitution. An amendment in 1941 lengthened terms to four years, but governors could no longer succeed themselves, having to wait four years to serve again. The constitution does not specify when terms start, only that the governor is installed at the next session of the General Assembly. The current constitution of 1983 allows governors to succeed themselves once before having to wait four years to serve again.

Qualifications
Anyone who seeks to be elected Governor of Georgia must meet the following qualifications:
Be at least thirty years of age when sworn in
Be a resident of Georgia for at least six years immediately preceding the election 
Be a United States citizen for at least fifteen years before the election

Vacancy
Originally, in the event of a vacancy, the president of the executive council acted as governor. This was changed in 1798 to the president of the senate. The 1945 constitution created the office of lieutenant governor, who would act as governor if that office became vacant; in 1983, this was changed so that the lieutenant governor now becomes governor in the event of a vacancy.

Three governors controversy

In December 1946, Governor-elect Eugene Talmadge died before assuming office. Talmadge's son, Herman, was appointed governor by the State Legislature. This was challenged by the Lieutenant Governor-elect Melvin Thompson, who maintained that the state constitution authorized him to assume the office upon the death of the governor. Outgoing governor Ellis Arnall announced that he would not relinquish the office until it was clear who the new governor was. The political turmoil that ensued became known as the "three governors controversy". In January 1947, while all three governors occupied different portions of the State Capitol, Secretary of State Ben W. Fortson Jr., took the Great Seal of the State of Georgia and hid it. This prevented any of the claimants to the governorship from executing any business until the Supreme Court of Georgia could make a ruling on the rightful winner. Thompson was eventually declared "acting governor" until a special election could be held to fill the remainder of the original term. Herman Talmadge won the special election and served out the remaining portion of his father's term.

Exceptions and omissions
The revolutionary government was thrown into disarray by the capture of Savannah in 1778, which led to several governments with varying levels of influence; they would reunite in 1780. The Official and Statistical Register of Georgia ignores the Council of Safety of William Ewen in favor of Archibald Bulloch's government, and omits the government of William Glascock and Seth John Cuthbert. The Register includes colonial governors in its numbering, listing Archibald Bulloch as the 7th governor.

Succession

Article V, Section 1, Paragraph V of the Constitution of Georgia provides a plan of succession in the event of the death or incapacitation of the Governor. The first successor would be the Lieutenant Governor, followed by the Speaker of the Georgia House of Representatives.

See also
 First ladies of Georgia
 List of colonial governors of Georgia

References

General

 
 
 A History of Georgia, second ed.  Kenneth Coleman, general editor.  University of Georgia Press: 1991.

Constitutions

 
 
 
 
 
 
 
 
 
 
 
 

Governors
1776 establishments in Georgia (U.S. state)